The 2016 Limerick Premier Intermediate Hurling Championship was the third staging of the Limerick Premier Intermediate Hurling Championship since its establishment by the Limerick County Board in 2014.

On 8 October 2016, Monaleen won the championship after a 1-17 to 2-11 defeat of Cappamore in the final at FitzGerald Park, Kilmallock. It was their first ever championship title in this grade.

Results

Final

References

External links

 Limerick GAA website

Limerick Premier Intermediate Hurling Championship
Limerick Premier Intermediate Hurling Championship